Eduardo Alejandro Nazar Clavería (born 1 March 1961) is a Chilean former footballer who played as a attacking midfielder for clubs in Chile, Spain and Switzerland.

Club career
A product of Universidad Católica youth system, Nazar made two appearances in the Chilean top division in 1979. In 1980, he took part in the Croix International Tournament with the youth team, alongside fellows such as Fernando Díaz, Juvenal Olmos and Patricio Mardones, where they became champion. After having little chance to play at the league, he was loaned to Unión San Felipe from 1984 to 1985.

After joining Palestino, he was loaned to Spanish side Logroñés and Unión San Felipe again in 1985. For Logroñés, he made eight appearances and scored two goals in the Segunda División.

Having played for Deportes Concepción in 1986 and 1987, he returned to Europe and played for FC Aarau, scoring in his debut, and Étoile Carouge in Switzerland.

Back in Chile, he played for Naval, Deportes Concepción and Rangers de Talca.

Coaching career

Previously, he had served as assistant of Raúl Toro in Santiago Morning.

Honours
Universidad Católica
 Croix International Tournament: 1980

References

External links
 
 
 

1961 births
Living people
Footballers from Santiago
Chilean footballers
Chilean expatriate footballers
Chilean Primera División players
Club Deportivo Universidad Católica footballers
Unión San Felipe footballers
Club Deportivo Palestino footballers
Deportes Concepción (Chile) footballers
Naval de Talcahuano footballers
Segunda División players
UD Logroñés players
Swiss Super League players
FC Aarau players
Swiss Challenge League players
Étoile Carouge FC players
Primera B de Chile players
Rangers de Talca footballers
Chilean expatriate sportspeople in Spain
Chilean expatriate sportspeople in Switzerland
Expatriate footballers in Spain
Expatriate footballers in Switzerland
Association football midfielders
Chilean football managers